Boa nebulosa, the Dominican boa constrictor, is a species of snake in the family Boidae. The species is endemic to Dominica.

References

External Links
 iNaturalist page

nebulosa
Reptiles of Dominica
Reptiles described in 1964